Kasun Caldera (born 3 November 1992) is a Sri Lankan cricketer. He made his List A debut for Nondescripts Cricket Club in the 2018–19 Premier Limited Overs Tournament on 10 March 2019. He made his first-class debut on 6 March 2020, for Nondescripts Cricket Club in the 2019–20 Premier League Tournament.

References

External links
 

1992 births
Living people
Sri Lankan cricketers
Nondescripts Cricket Club cricketers
Place of birth missing (living people)